was a Japanese landing craft depot ship and escort aircraft carrier operated by the Imperial Japanese Army (IJA). In some sources Akitsu Maru and her sister ship  are also considered to be the first amphibious assault ships.

Design features
Akitsu Maru was a passenger liner taken over before completion by the Imperial Japanese Army. The ship was fitted with a flight deck above the hull, but had no hangar so the aircraft were stored below the flight deck on the original main deck. Conventional aircraft were able to fly off from her deck but could not land aboard due to lack of landing mechanisms, although in July 1944 KX arresting gear was fitted on the flight deck. The Kokusai Ki-76 and Kayaba Ka-1 were flown off Akitsu Maru, as the former was a small, slow aircraft that could land on its short deck and the latter was an autogyro which could even more easily land on a short deck without assistance. She could also carry 27 .

Akitsu Marus planned role was to provide aircover during amphibious and landing operations; in practice the ship was essentially an aircraft ferry.

With the deployment of the  Shinshū Maru and a further refinement, the larger Akitsu Maru, the Japanese amphibious forces had in hand prototypes for all-purpose amphibious ships. In 1937, British and American observers watched Shinshū Maru at work off Shanghai and immediately recognized a significant development in amphibious warfare. The ship carried landing craft in a well deck that could be flooded, which allowed the landing craft to float free from an open stern gate. The ship could also hold additional craft on davits, but its next-most impressive function was an ability to discharge vehicles from a deck-level parking garage directly onto a pier. It also carried two catapults for aircraft but did not embark operational seaplanes. It could, however, transport and unload aircraft if necessary, a capability further developed in the Akitsu Maru, which even had a short take-off flight deck.

Fate

One of the torpedoes set off her aft magazine holding depth charges, the explosion shattering the aft portion of the ship. As the seas hit her boilers, they exploded and she sank in the Korean Strait on 15 November 1944.  2,046 men, mainly of the Imperial Japanese Army's 64th Infantry Regiment, including the commander, were killed. Also 104 Maru-ni explosive motor boats (EMB) went down with the ship. The escorts rescued 310 survivors. Her sister ship  was sunk by the submarine  on 12 January 1944, with the loss of 574 men.

See also
  - Imperial Japanese Army
 Imperial Japanese Army Railways and Shipping Section
 Kokusai Ki-76

References

Sources
 
 
 
 
 

Escort carriers of the Imperial Japanese Army
Ships built by IHI Corporation
1941 ships
World War II escort carriers of Japan
Amphibious warfare vessels
Ships sunk by American submarines
Japanese inventions